Michael Moroney may refer to:
 Mike Moroney, Australian athlete
 Mick Moroney, Irish hurler
 Michael Moroney (horseman), New Zealand racehorse trainer

See also
  Mike Maroney, member of the West Virginia Senate